"I'm Gonna Make You Mine" is a song released in 1969 by Lou Christie. It was featured on his 1969 album I'm Gonna Make You Mine, arranged by Stan Vincent and produced by Vincent and Mike Duckman.

Background
The song was arranged in the style of Phil Spector's Wall of Sound. Backing vocals were provided by Ellie Greenwich and Linda Scott, in one of her last recordings before leaving show business.

Chart performance
The song spent 12 weeks on the Billboard Hot 100 chart, peaking at No. 10, while reaching No. 2 on the UK Singles Chart and on WLS and No. 5 on Canada's RPM 100.

"I'm Gonna Make You Mine" was ranked No. 60 on Billboard magazine's Top Hot 100 songs of 1969.

Weekly charts

Year-end charts

References

External links
 

1969 songs
1969 singles
Songs written by Tony Romeo
Lou Christie songs
Buddah Records singles
Song recordings with Wall of Sound arrangements